John Henry Norrison Camidge (8 December 1853 - 22 September 1939) was a composer and organist based in Beverley, East Riding of Yorkshire.

Life
He was born in 1853, the son of Thomas Simpson Camidge, and baptised in St. Michael-le-Belfrey on 5 January 1854.

He was a chorister at Christ Church Cathedral, Oxford. He matriculated in 1875.

He was appointed organist at Beverley Minster on 15 July 1876.

He was also music master at Beverley High School and conductor of the Beverley Choral Society.

He retired in 1933 but continued as Organist Emeritus until his death on 22 September 1939.

Appointments
 Organist at Beverley Minster 1876 - 1933

Compositions
He wrote:
 2 Evening Services
 A dozen or so anthems
 Chants in the New Catholic Chant Book
 The Collegiate Psalter

References

1853 births
1939 deaths
English organists
British male organists
English composers